Hällefors Municipality (Hällefors kommun) is a municipality in Örebro County in central Sweden. Its seat is located in the town of Hällefors.

The amalgamations connected with the 1971 municipal reform took place already in 1967 when "old" Hällefors was amalgamated with Grythyttan and the parish of Hjulsjö, which 1965-1966 temporarily had been in Nora Municipality.

The municipality has a beautiful nature with many different activities. Hiking on trails or in nature reserves, fishing or canoeing in more than 400 lakes and waterways or biking on roads through deep forests.

Localities
Hammarn
Hällefors (seat)
Grythyttan

Riksdag elections

History
The area has traditionally been a mining district.

Industry
Hällefors used to be the seat of Hellefors Bruks AB, which in the early 20th century was one of the largest manufacturing companies in central Sweden. It produced iron and steel, mechanical wood pulp, sulfite and sulfate pulp, sawn timber, joinery and box boards. It mined, for its own requirements and for sale, ore from its own iron ore fields. At a large number of its own power stations, situated on Svartälven and its tributaries, the company produced electrical energy which was widely distributed to its own works and outside customers. The company also grew timber on a large scale, and an extensive private railway system runs right through the company's forests which cover several hundred thousand acres in Hällefors and surrounding municipalities. The general management of the company was at Hällefors, where the company operated ironworks, a wood-grinding mill, a sawmill, a box factory and joinery works.

The small town Loka is located in Hällefors Municipality. They are bottling mineral water from their well, that once housed a thermal bath. The water is sold in almost any store in Sweden, including Systembolaget.

Twin towns
Hällefors four twin towns with the year of its establishing:

(1978) Pohja (Pojo), Finland 
(1992) Lüchow, Germany 
(2001) Orkdal, Norway 
(2003) Jelgava, Latvia

References

External links
Hällefors Municipality - Official site
Hällefors Herrgård - Hellefors Country Manor

Municipalities of Örebro County
fi:Hällefors